Charles Howgate Guy Jr. (February 5, 1924 – May 22, 2010) was an American football and lacrosse player and coach. He served as the head football coach at Johns Hopkins University in 1950 and as the head lacrosse coach at the University of Virginia from 1949 to 1950.
Charlie was born on February 5, 1924, in Pittsburgh, Pennsylvania. He attended New Trier High School in Chicago, IL where he was an exceptional football player.

Head coaching record

Football

References

1924 births
2010 deaths
Navy Midshipmen football players
Navy Midshipmen men's lacrosse players
Johns Hopkins Blue Jays football coaches
Virginia Cavaliers football coaches
Virginia Cavaliers men's lacrosse coaches
Players of American football from Pittsburgh